Jonathan Marc Sherman (born October 10, 1968) is a contemporary American playwright, poet, and actor. He submitted plays for several years to Young Playwrights Inc.'s National Playwrights Competition before they did a staged reading of his one-act, Serendipity and Serenity in 1987, followed by a full production of his next play, Women and Wallace (1988).

Jonathan is married to Alexandra Shiva, they have two children, a daughter and a son Thea and Sam Sherman

Plays

Serendipity and Serenity
1987. Young Playwrights Festival at Playwrights Horizons (staged reading)

Women and Wallace
1988. Foundation of the Dramatists Guild (now Young Playwrights Inc.) Young Playwrights Festival at Playwrights Horizons. Josh Hamilton as Wallace
1990. American Playhouse (PBS television), with Josh Hamilton (Wallace), Joan Copeland, Shaie Dively, Erica Gimpel, Joanna Going, Mary Joy, Debra Monk, Cynthia Nixon, and Jill Tasker. Directed by Don Scardino.

Jesus on the Oil Tank
Winner of the 21st Century Playwrights Award

Sons and Fathers
The short play is about a family of two brothers, Toby and Max, and their father, fifteen years after the mother committed suicide. Toby, an idealist who has never quite recovered from his mother's death, still wears diapers at the age of 21 and hardly leaves the house. His older brother Max often lectures him on the ways of life and love. Joanna, a new representative for the diaper company responsible for Toby's deliveries, makes a delivery and Toby instantly falls in love.  The play ends with Toby leaving the house, and more symbolically, his dependence on his mother's memory, to be with Joanna.

The play was written in 1991, and was performed by Ethan Hawke's Malaparte Theater Company in New York City. Calista Flockhart played Joanna, Josh Hamilton (actor) played Toby and Ethan Hawke played Max. In the play's earlier incarnation as a workshop reading, Sherman himself played the part of Toby.

Veins and Thumbtacks
 1991. Los Angeles Theatre Center. Jimmy Bonaparte: Fisher Stevens
 1994. Malaparte (theater company) in New York City. Jimmy Bonaparte: Frank Whaley
 2001. Basis for Frank Whaley's movie The Jimmy Show, with Frank Whaley, Carla Gugino, Ethan Hawke, and Lynn Cohen.

Sophistry
 March, 1993. Playwrights Horizons. With Linda Atkinson, Nadia Dajani, Ethan Hawke, Katherine Hiler, Scarlett Johansson, Dick Latessa, Anthony Rapp, Jonathan Marc Sherman, and Steve Zahn
 September–November, 1993. Playwrights Horizons. With Linda Atkinson, Nadia Dajani, Calista Flockhart, Ethan Hawke, Austin Pendleton, Anthony Rapp, Jonathan Marc Sherman, and Steve Zahn.

Wonderful Time
1995. WPA Theater in New York City.

Evolution
 1998. Williamstown Theatre Festival in Massachusetts. Directed by Nicholas Martin. With Matt McGrath (actor) (Henry), Dylan Baker (Storyteller), Anna Belknap (Gina), Marin Hinkle (Hope), Justin Kirk (Ernie), and Sam Breslin Wright (Rex). Sets by Alexander Dodge, Lights by Stephen Brady, Costumes by Marisa Timperman, Sound by Jerry N. Yager
 2002. 45 Below at Culture Project in New York City. Directed by Elizabeth Gottlieb. With Josh Hamilton (actor) (Henry), Larry Block (Storyteller), Peter Dinklage (Rex), Keira Naughton (Hope), Armando Riesco (Ernie), and Ione Skye (Gina). Sets by Andromache Chalfant, Lights by Jeff Croiter, Costumes by Daphne Javitch, Video by Edmond Deraedt

Things We Want
 2007. The New Group in New York City. Directed by Ethan Hawke. With Paul Dano (Charlie), Peter Dinklage (Sty), Josh Hamilton (actor) (Teddy), and Zoe Kazan (Stella). Sets by Derek McLane, Lights by Jeff Croiter, Costumes by Mattie Ulrich, Sound by Daniel Baker.
 2012. Oyun Alani in Istanbul. Directed by Cevdet Canver. With Kutay Kunt (Charlie), Caner Erdem (Sty), Mehmet Okuroglu (Teddy), and Aybike Turan (Stella).
 2015 (Coming in October). Columbia University in New York City. Directed by Eric Wimer. With William Sydney (Charlie), Maeve Duffy (Sty), Joseph Santia (Teddy), and Lizzy Harding (Stella).
 2018 in Manchester UK; Hope Mill Theatre; Directed by Daniel Bradford. With Alex Phelps (Teddy), William J Holstead (Sty), Paddy Young (Charlie), Hannah Ellis Ryan (Stella).

Knickerbocker
 2009. Williamstown Theatre Festival in Massachusetts. Directed by Nicholas Martin. With Brooks Ashmanskas (Melvin), Peter Dinklage (Chester), Bob Dishy (Raymond), Rightor Doyle (Steve), Annie Parisse (Tara), Susan Pourfar (Pauline), and Reg Rogers (Jerry). Sets by Alexander Dodge. Sound Design by Alex Neumann.
 2011. The Public Theater in New York City. Directed by Pippin Parker. With Mia Barron (Pauline), Alexander Chaplin (Jerry), Bob Dishy (Raymond), Christina Kirk (Tara), Drew Madland (Steve), Zak Orth (Chester), and Ben Shenkman (Melvin). Sets by Peter Ksander, Costumes by Gabriel Berry, Lights by Jeff Croiter, Sound by Walter Trarbach, Projection Design by Shawn Duan.

Clive
2013. The New Group in New York City. Directed by Ethan Hawke. With Brooks Ashmanskas, Vincent D’Onofrio, Ethan Hawke, Stephanie Janssen, Mahira Kakkar, Zoe Kazan, Aaron Krohn, Dana Lyn, and Jonathan Marc Sherman. Sets by Derek McLane, Lights by Jeff Croiter, Costumes by Catherine Zuber, Sound by Shane Rettig.

Bob & Carol & Ted & Alice
2020. The New Group in New York City. Book by Jonathan Marc Sherman, Music by Duncan Sheik, Lyrics by Sheik and Amanda Green, Musical Staging by Kelly Devine, Directed by Scott Elliott. With Jennifer Damiano, Jamie Mohamdein, Ana Nogueira, Joel Perez, Suzanne Vega, and Michael Zegen. Sets by Derek McLane, Lights by Jeff Croiter, Costumes by Jeff Mahshie, Sound by Jessica Paz. Music Direction by Jason Hart. Consultant: Jill Mazursky. Based on the Columbia Pictures motion picture directed by Paul Mazursky and written by Mazursky and Larry Tucker.

Acting

Theater
Oliver! (as "The Artful Dodger") Pittsburgh Civic Light Opera, 1983
My First Swedish Bombshell (TV) (Harrison Slide) NBC & Showtime, 1985
The Chopin Playoffs (as "Irving Yanover") American Jewish Theatre, 1986
A Joke (as "Grizzoffi"), Malaparte (theater company), 1992
Sophistry (as "Igor"), Playwrights Horizons, 1993
Wild Dogs, Malaparte (theater company), 1993
Unexpected Tenderness (as "Roddy Stern"), WPA, 1994
The Great Unwashed, Malaparte (theater company), 1994
Quiz Show (as Don Quixote Student #2), 1994
Southie (as "Eddie Eaton"), 1998
Pigeonholed (as Bartender), 1999
I Wanna Be Adored,  NY Performance Works, 2000
Zog's Place (as himself), 2001
Broadway: The American Musical (TV), 2004
The Baxter (as "Deaf Bar Baxter"), 2005
Escape Artists (as "Linus"), 2005
The Limbo Room (as "Guy Greenbaum"), 2006
Steam (as "Norman"), 2006
When The Nines Roll Over (as "the Australian"), 2006
The Hottest State (as "Party Philosopher"), 2007
Up For Anything (as "Walter Dabney"), The Kraine Theater, 2009
Ivanov (as "Dr. Lvov"), Classic Stage Company, 2012
Blaze (as "Sam"), 2018

Film
Tick, Tick... Boom! (as "Ira Weitzman"), 2021

External links

1968 births
20th-century American dramatists and playwrights
Place of birth missing (living people)
American male film actors
American male stage actors
Living people